Nawroz University is a private university located in the Kurdistan Region of Iraq.

Nawroz University is a higher education private university founded on July 20, 2004. It consists of fourteen academic departments at five colleges of Law and Politics, Administration and Economics, Languages, Engineering and Science. Initially named Duhok University College, the institution was founded in 2004 by the Syndicate of Economists in Duhok Governorate, with the approval of the Prime Minister of Kurdistan Region. The university started accepting students on 20 July 2004, and teaching began on 1 December 2004, based on resolution 3/2 of the Consultation Committee of the Ministry of Higher Education and Scientific Research in the Kurdistan Region.

Duhok University College expanded, and in 2009 it was renamed Nawroz University, in accordance with decision 2854 of the Council of Ministers.

The university includes five colleges:
 College of Economics & Administration
College of Law and Political Science
 College of Science
 College of Languages
 College of Engineering

Academic Staff 
Dr. Abdulwahab Khalid Mosa, President of University
Dr. Mohammedali Yaseen Taha, Vice President of University
Dr. Omar Habeeb, Vice President of University for Scientific & Postgraduate Affairs
Dr. Hikmat Rasheed, Dean College of Economics & Administration
Dr. Dilshad Abdulrahman, Dean College of Law and Political Science
Dr. Hussein Ahmed, Dean College of Languages

References

External links
 Nawroz University official website

Duhok
2004 establishments in Iraq
Educational institutions established in 2004
Dohuk Governorate